A filhó (or filhós in plural) is a traditional dessert in Portugal and Northeastern Brazil.

Filhós are usually made by forming balls from a mixture of flour and eggs. When the dough has risen, the balls are deep fried and sprinkled with a mixture of sugar and cinnamon. This is a traditional Christmas bake in Portugal. 
The Brazilian variety is not sprinkled and is usually covered with honey or with melted rapadura (which in Brazilian Portuguese is usually called "mel de rapadura").

See also
List of doughnut varieties
 Ganmodoki, named after filhós in parts of Japan
 Malasada, of Madeiran origin

References

External links

Portuguese desserts
Christmas food
Doughnuts
Squash and pumpkin dishes